Don Cupitt (born 22 May 1934) is an English philosopher of religion and scholar of Christian theology. He has been an Anglican priest and a lecturer in the University of Cambridge, though is better known as a popular writer, broadcaster and commentator. He has been described as a "radical theologian", noted for his ideas about "non-realist" philosophy of religion.

Career
Cupitt was born in Oldham and educated at Charterhouse School in Godalming, Surrey, Trinity Hall, Cambridge, and Westcott House, Cambridge. He studied, successively, natural sciences, theology and the philosophy of religion. In 1959 he was ordained deacon in the Church of England, becoming a priest in 1960. After short periods as a curate in the North of England, and as vice-principal of Westcott House, Cupitt was elected to a Fellowship and appointed dean at Emmanuel College, Cambridge late in 1965. Since then he has remained at the college. In 1968 he was appointed to a university teaching post in philosophy of religion, a position in which he continued until his retirement for health reasons in 1996. At that time he proceeded to a life fellowship at Emmanuel College, which remains his base today. In the early 1990s he stopped officiating at public worship and in 2008 he ceased to be a communicant member of the church. Although he has been a priest, he is better known as a writer, broadcaster and populariser of innovative theological ideas.  He has written 40 books—which have been translated into Dutch, Persian, Polish, Korean, Portuguese, Danish, German and Chinese—as well as chapters in more than 30 multi-authored volumes.

Cupitt came to the British public's attention in 1984 with his BBC television series The Sea of Faith, in which orthodox Christian beliefs were challenged. The series took its title from Matthew Arnold's poem Dover Beach, which reflected on the decline of faith. Cupitt is currently a key figure in the Sea of Faith Network, a group of spiritual "explorers" (based in the United Kingdom, New Zealand and Australia) who share Cupitt's concerns. Prompted by the series, Giles Fraser sought a meeting with Cupitt, which led Fraser from atheism into the church.

Since he began writing in 1971, Cupitt's views have continued to evolve and change. In his early books such as Taking Leave of God and The Sea of Faith Cupitt talks of God alone as non-real, but by the end of the 1980s he moved into postmodernism, describing his position as empty radical humanism: that is, there is nothing but our language, our world, and the meanings, truths and interpretations that we have generated. Everything is non-real, including God.

In his writings Cupitt sometimes describes himself as Christian non-realist, by which he means that he follows certain spiritual practices and attempts to live by ethical standards traditionally associated with Christianity but without believing in the actual existence of the underlying metaphysical entities (such as "Christ" and "God"). He calls this way of being a non-realist Christian "solar living".

Quotations
Cupitt has an entry in the 8th edition of The Oxford Dictionary of Quotations: "Christmas is the Disneyfication of Christianity."

Books
(Partial list)
Crisis of Moral Authority: The Dethronement of Christianity, Lutterworth Press, 1972, 
Who was Jesus? (London: British Broadcasting Corporation, 1977). With Peter Armstrong.
The Debate About Christ. SCM Press, 1979 
Taking Leave of God, SCM Press, 1980, 2001 edition: 
The Sea of Faith, BBC Books, 1984, Cambridge University Press 1988 edition: 
The Long-Legged Fly: A Theology of Language and Desire, SCM Press, 1987 
The Time Being, SCM Press, 1992, 
After All: Religion Without Alienation, SCM Press, 1994, 
After God: The Future of Religion, Basic Books, 1997, 
Mysticism After Modernity, Blackwell Publishers, 1998, 
The Religion of Being, SCM Press, 1998, 
The New Religion of Life in Everyday Speech, SCM Press, 1999, 
Reforming Christianity, Polebridge Press, 2001, 
Emptiness & Brightness, Polebridge Press. 2001, 
Is Nothing Sacred?: The Non-Realist Philosophy of Religion (selected essays), Fordham University Press, 2003, 
The Way To Happiness: A Theory of Religion, Polebridge Press, 2005, 
The Old Creed and the New, SCM Press, 2006, 
Radical Theology, Polebridge Press, 2006: 
Impossible Loves, Polebridge Press, 2007, 
Above Us Only Sky, Polebridge Press, 2008, 
The Meaning of the West, SCM Press, 2008, 
Jesus and Philosophy, SCM Press, 2009, 

In Chapter 13 of his book After God:The Future of Religion, Cupitt documents how the gradual disintegration of religious belief and supernatural views of the world has led to the growth of naturalism. For Cupitt, the abandonment of religion has also been aided by technological advances and the growing number of sources of authority. He goes on to argue that many people still hold on to their religious beliefs purely out of 'ethnic loyalty', and that, despite people's best efforts, religion will continue to liquidate.

See also
Christian atheism
Death of God
Lloyd Geering
Nontheism
Postchristianity
Post-theism

References

Further reading
Holding Fast to God: A Reply to Don Cupitt, Keith Ward, Abingdon Press, 1990, 
The Predicament of Postmodern Theology: Radical Orthodoxy or Nihilist Textualism?, Gavin Hyman, Westminster John Knox Press, 2001
Odyssey on the Sea of Faith: The Life and Writings of Don Cupitt, Nigel Leaves, Polebridge Press, 2004, 
Surfing on the Sea of Faith: The Ethics and Religion of Don Cupitt, Nigel Leaves, Polebridge Press, 2005, 
New Directions in Philosophical Theology: Essays in Honour of Don Cupitt, Gavin Hyman (editor), Ashgate Publishing, 2005,

External links

Sea of Faith Network
Video interview on Empathy Media, Don Cupitt's Religious Journey 
 Interviewed by Alan Macfarlane 16 February 2009 (video)
Audio interview with Don Cupitt on Philosophy Bites podcast

1934 births
Living people
English Christian theologians
Fellows of Emmanuel College, Cambridge
20th-century English Anglican priests
Religious naturalists
People from Oldham
Alumni of Trinity Hall, Cambridge
People educated at Charterhouse School
Alumni of Westcott House, Cambridge
Staff of Westcott House, Cambridge
Members of the Jesus Seminar